Efrat is an Israel based non profit organization. Efrat strives to provide emotional, financial, and vocational assistance to pregnant women who are being pressured to terminate their pregnancy. Efrat believes in completely supporting the choice of a pregnant woman.

Efrat is not political and believes in empowering women to make informed decisions regarding their pregnancy. The women Efrat supports often feel that before learning of Efrat they were led to believe they have no choice but to terminate their pregnancy. Efrat provides them hope and continued support.

Efrat deals with adult women and most of the women that turn to Efrat are married.

The organization's approach is described in their website www.cribefrat.org

The organization's main offices are located in Jerusalem, and, according to the organization most of the assistance is provided by volunteers of all walks of life all around the country. Until 2021 it was led by Dr. Eli J. Schussheim.

Efrat has assisted over 83,000 women have the babies they so desperately wanted.

Name
The name "Efrat" comes from I Chronicles, in which Efrat is the name of Caleb's wife (according to Jewish tradition, she is none other than Miriam). The Midrash Rabbah writes, "Why was she called Efrat? Because Israel was fruitful ("paru") and multiplied through her." This refers to her actions against Pharaoh's decree of infanticide, by which she saved the lives of many Israelite children.

Criticism 

Various bodies, among them Mishpacha Hadasha ("New Family"), have attacked the organization. The central complaint is that the religious stance of the organization supports the protection of the pregnancy at almost any price and can make both mother and child miserable, such as pregnancies that involve medical danger. The latter criticism is directly contradicted by the facts — the religious stance of the organization is that Jewish law (halacha) actually requires abortion in a case that involves medical danger to the mother, as her life takes precedence over that of an unborn fetus. 

A law proposed by  Knesset Member Reshef Chayne of Shinui attempted to prevent Efrat from providing information to women considering abortion, on the basis he considered it harassment of the pregnant woman. The law was not passed, and certain legalists attacked it.

Another criticism was that the organization would station women outside offices where abortion permits are issued, with the aim of appealing to women visiting the offices. The Israel Religious Action Center appealed against the rules which regulate the pay grade of those who volunteer for National Service by participating in Efrat's activities, claiming "infringement of privacy, dignity and freedom of conscience of the women," an appeal which was dismissed by the Supreme Court of Israel.

In 2012, Efrat "ambassadors" were criticized for encouraging a pregnant teen not to have an abortion, because the teen couple later attempted suicide.

In response, Efrat claims that it is not opposed to  abortion. Efrat believes in empowering women to make uncoerced informed decisions. 
Additionally, the organization clarified that it does not deal with teenage pregnancies. The claims made against Efrat were never substantiated and Efrat had no connection to the said case.
Efrat is not a religious organization and does not make any statement regarding the religious or moral standing of abortion. 

Efrat does not station women outside of clinics where abortions take place. 
Efrat assists women who want to continue their pregnancies but want to ensure that women are not forced into abortions out of economic or emotional pressures.

See also
 Abortion in Israel
 Crisis pregnancy center

References 

Www.cribefrat.org

External links 
Efrat's website
A review of Efrat, from a meeting of the Knesset's Committee on the Status of Women (Hebrew)
"Sefer Hahayim (Book of Life)", an interview with Dr. Eli J. Shussheim in the newspaper HaTzofe (Hebrew)
Ofrah Locks, Sefer Hahayim (Book of Life), a report on Efrat in Besheva (Hebrew)
Responsa on the topic of abortion in cases of severe illness (Hebrew)

Abortion in Israel
Crisis pregnancy centers
Jewish charities based in Israel
Anti-abortion organizations
Volunteer organizations in Israel